is an upcoming Japanese television drama series.

Cast
 Erika Toda as Michiru
 Kengo Kora as Takei
 Tasuku Emoto as Kyutarou
 Hirofumi Arai as Toyomasu
 Nao Omori

References

Japanese drama television series
2013 Japanese television series debuts
NHK original programming
Television shows based on Japanese novels